Several war memorials and war graves have been erected in the Belgian region Flanders to memorialize the events that took place there during World War I. By the end of 1914 the Western Front ran from Nieuwpoort on the North Sea Coast to the Swiss Border. After the war, many memorials were erected in and along the area through which the front line had been. Five memorials are carillons, musical instruments of bells, which memorialize the loss of lives, cultural heritage, and bells during the war. Most of the war memorials in Flanders can be found in the Province of West Flanders, which comprises the arrondissements of Bruges, Diksmuide, Ypres, Kortrijk, Ostend, Roeselare, Tielt and Veurne.

Military cemeteries in West Flanders

WW I memorials in West Flanders

Yser Area
There are many monuments and memorials in this sector which celebrate the Battle of the Yser and other events. These include –

Ypres Salient

Historical background
The Ypres Salient was the site of five battles during World War I: The First Battle of Ypres (19 October – 22 November 1914), the Second Battle of Ypres (22 April – 15 May 1915), the Third Battle of Ypres, also known as the Battle of Passchendaele (31 July – 6 November 1917), the Fourth Battle of Ypres, also known as the Battle of the Lys (9–29 April 1918), and the Fifth Battle of Ypres (28 September  – 2 October 1918).

Memorials to the French

Memorials to military units

Divisional memorials

Regimental memorials

Memorials linked to Hill 60

Memorials to the Missing
In the Ypres Salient battlefields there are approximately 90,000 British and Commonwealth soldiers whose remains could not be identified for burial in a grave marked with their name. Similarly, there are also believed to be about 90,000 German soldiers whose remains were never identified as was the case with the remains of many French soldiers found on the battlefields. For the 90,000 missing British Forces there are four memorials in the Ypres Salient which cover the whole period of the First World War, except the months of August and September 1914:
 The Menin Gate Memorial to the Missing.
 The Tyne Cot Memorial to the Missing.
 The New Zealand Memorial (Tyne Cot Cemetery).
 The Messines Ridge (New Zealand) Memorial.

The Ploegsteert Memorial to the Missing south of Messines is technically outside the sector known as the Ypres Salient, and commemorates the missing of the Lys battlefield sector. Its proximity to Ypres means that many visitors to the Ypres Salient include this in their visit to the area. Names of missing German soldiers are inscribed on oak panels and bronze tablets at Langemark German cemetery and French soldiers are commemorated in several ossuaries in the area.

Menin Gate Memorial

Tyne Cot and New Zealand Memorial

Messines Ridge (New Zealand) Memorial

New Zealand Memorial in Buttes Cemetery

Ploegsteert Memorial

Belgian municipal and parochial memorials
Most villages and towns in West Flanders have their own war memorials, either civil or parochial. These can be traced in this website.

Demarcation Stones

Memorial carillons

Throughout the German invasion of Belgium, the heavy artillery fire destroyed many of the country's bell towers, many of which contained swinging bell sets, carillons, and other large bells. In the subsequent occupation, Belgian carillons fell completely silent. Germans would demand carillonneurs to continue ringing their instruments, but they often fled or refused. In other areas, occupiers banned the ringing of bells. To the allies, the destroyed and unused bells were highly publicized and romanticized in poetry and in propaganda. Writers described the bells as if they were in mourning, waiting for liberation to ring out again that peace has calmed the world. As a result of this romanticization, carillons were constructed in Flanders over time in the name of world peace and in memory of those who died during the war:

 In Leuven, 16 American engineering societies donated a carillon to the Academic libraries in memory of the American engineers who died in the war. It consisted of 48 bells, one for each U.S. state at the time (Hawaii and Alaska were U.S. territories). The carillon was completed and dedicated on 4 July 1928. It narrowly survived destruction in the Second World War, but fell into disrepair. American carillonneur Margo Halsted led a major restoration and expansion to 63 bells, which was realized in 1983.
 On 22 November 1914, during the First Battle of Ypres, the town's Cloth Hall came under heavy artillery fire and was destroyed, including its two carillons. In 1934, one year into the tower's meticulous reconstruction, bellfounder Marcel Michiels Jr. delivered a new, 49-bell carillon. Due to its unsatisfactory sound, it was retuned in 1963 by Petit & Fritsen. Because the tower houses the In Flanders Fields Museum since 1988, the carillon often supplements its music with bagpipes and trumpets.
Parts of old artillery shells were used in the carillon's bell bronze to symbolize reconciliation. The carillon was suggested by a church official, who remarked at city's lack of carillon compared to others in Flanders.
 During the Burning of Leuven, the city's carillon in St. Peter's Church was destroyed. The original site of this instrument, from 1730 to 1811, was in Park Abbey. In 2012, the cities of Leuven and Neuss, the latter from which most of the troops that destroyed Leuven came, began constructing a carillon, a replica of the original, for Park Abbey's empty tower. It was inaugurated on 11 November 2018, one century after the armistice.

Further reading

Websites
 France- French Website, enables searches to be made for French soldiers killed in 1914–1918.
 Australia- Australian Website, A website for matters concerning the Australian Imperial Force.
 Canada-Canadian website, has facilities to search for Canadian service records of the 1914–1918 war.
 Germany-German Website, details of German cemeteries

Books
 Arthur, M. "Forgotten Voices of the Great War" 
 Buffetaut, Y. "Ypres 22 avril 1915" 
 Cave, N. "Hill 60 Ypres" 
 Cooksey, J. "Images of War. Flanders-1915"  
 Farrar-Hockley, A."Death of An Army"  
 Gliddon, G. "VCs of the First World War 1914" 
 Holmes, R. "Army Battlefield Guide. Belgium and Northern France" 
 Holt, T. and V. "Major and Mrs Holt's Battlefield Guide to the Ypres Salient" 
 "Illustrated Michelin Guides to the Battlefields (1914–1918) Ypres and The Battles of Ypres" 
 Lomas, D. "First Ypres 1914 The Graveyard of the Old Contemptibles" 
 MacDonald, L. "1915. The Death of Innocence" 
 Neillands, R. "The Old Contemptibles. The British Expeditionary Force 1914" 
 Royon, G. "Massacre of the Innocents The Crofton Diaries Ypres 1914–1915"

See also

 Flanders Field American Cemetery and Memorial
 List of World War I Memorials and Cemeteries in Alsace
 List of World War I memorials and cemeteries in Artois
 List of World War I memorials and cemeteries in Champagne-Ardennes
 List of World War I Memorials and Cemeteries in Lorraine
 List of World War I memorials and cemeteries in the area of the St Mihiel salient
 List of World War I memorials and cemeteries in the Somme
 List of World War I memorials and cemeteries in Verdun

References

Flanders
Flanders
Flanders

Flanders
Memorials and Cemeteries in Flanders
Memorials and Cemeteries in Flanders